Jessie Walker (born 20 September 1994) is an English professional racing cyclist. After riding for the  team for four seasons, she joined the RST Racing Team in May 2015. However, in June 2015 she joined Servetto Footon for the remainder of the 2015 season. In October 2016 she announced that she would take a break from racing in the 2017 season after her time with Servetto Footon, which she described as "frustrating" and "demoralising" due to a lack of support from the team, stating that she had not been paid by them, and had depended on financial support from the Dave Rayner Fund. After splitting from Servetto Footon, she joined  as soigneur for 2017, before moving on to studying art and design at the end of the season.

She is the daughter of racing cyclist Chris Walker.

See also
 List of 2015 UCI Women's Teams and riders

References

External links

1994 births
Living people
English female cyclists
Sportspeople from Sheffield